Vangelis Nikokyrakis (born 4 October 2001) is a Greek professional footballer who plays as a forward for Super League 2 club Kifisia.

References

2001 births
Living people
OFI Crete F.C. players
Greece youth international footballers
Football League (Greece) players
Association football forwards
Footballers from Heraklion
Greek footballers